This is a list of international trips made by Gotabaya Rajapaksa as the 8th President of Sri Lanka from 2019 to 2022.

Summary of international trips
During his term, Gotabaya Rajapaksa made 6 foreign trips to 6 countries.

2019

2020
Gotabaya Rajapaksa made no international visits in the year 2020.

2021

2022

Multilateral meetings participated in by Rajapaksa

References

External links

Official
 State Visits  – President's Media Division

Presidential Trips
2019 in international relations
2020 in international relations
2021 in international relations
2022 in international relations
Rajapaksa, Gotabaya
Rajapaksa, Gotabaya